Peski is a rural locality (a village) in Gorod Vyazniki, Vyaznikovsky District, Vladimir Oblast, Russia. The population was 487 as of 2010. There are 6 streets.

Geography 
Peski is located 16 km southeast of Vyazniki (the district's administrative centre) by road. Danilkovo is the nearest rural locality.

References 

Rural localities in Vyaznikovsky District